The 2005 WNBA Playoffs was the postseason for the Women's National Basketball Association's 2005 season which ended with the Western Conference champion Sacramento Monarchs defeating the Eastern Conference champion Connecticut Sun 3-1. The Monarchs won their first ever WNBA title.

Format
The top 4 teams from each conference qualify for the playoffs.
All 4 teams are seeded by basis of their standings.

Road to the playoffs
Eastern Conference

Western Conference

Note:Teams with an "X" clinched playoff spots.

First round
- Connecticut defeats Detroit, 2-0
Connecticut 73, Detroit 62
Connecticut 75, Detroit 67

- Indiana defeats New York, 2-0
Indiana 63, New York 51
Indiana 58, New York 50

- Houston defeats Seattle, 2-1
Seattle 75, Houston 67
Houston 67, Seattle 64 
Houston 75, Seattle 58

- Sacramento defeats Los Angeles, 2-0
Sacramento 75, Los Angeles 72 
Sacramento 81, Los Angeles 63

Conference Finals

Eastern Conference Finals
- Connecticut defeats Indiana, 2-0
Connecticut 73, Indiana 68
Connecticut 77, Indiana 67 (OT)

Western Conference Finals
- Sacramento defeats Houston, 2-0
Sacramento 73, Houston 69 OT 
Sacramento 74, Houston 65

WNBA Finals

- Sacramento defeats Connecticut, 3-1
Sacramento 69, Connecticut 65
Connecticut 77, Sacramento 70 (OT)
Sacramento 66, Connecticut 55
Sacramento 62, Connecticut 59

See also
List of WNBA Champions

References

External links
Link to WNBA Playoffs series, recap, and boxscores
2005 WNBA Playoffs Schedule - WNBA - ESPN

Playoffs
Women's National Basketball Association Playoffs